Rifreddo is a comune (municipality) in the Province of Cuneo in the Italian region Piedmont, located about  southwest of Turin and about  northwest of Cuneo.

Rifreddo borders the following municipalities: Envie, Gambasca, Revello, and Sanfront.

References

External links
 Official website

Cities and towns in Piedmont